The following is a list of characters from the HBO television show Boardwalk Empire. The show dramatizes the prohibition era in Atlantic City and the early history of the American Mafia. Many of the characters on the show are fictional. Some are (loosely) based on historical figures; of these, some use the name of the person upon which they are based, while others have had their names changed for the program.

Cast

Main cast

Recurring cast

Main characters

Enoch "Nucky" Thompson

Steve Buscemi portrays Enoch "Nucky" Thompson, the corrupt treasurer of Atlantic County and its most powerful political figure. The character is based on Enoch L. Johnson.

James "Jimmy" Darmody

Michael Pitt portrays James "Jimmy" Darmody (seasons 1–2), a former Princeton student who served in World War I. After returning home, Jimmy is hired by Nucky Thompson as his driver. The character is based on Jimmy Boyd.

Margaret Thompson

Kelly Macdonald portrays Margaret Thompson (formerly Schroeder, née Rohan), a young Irish widow and mother, she turns to Nucky for help and eventually becomes his lover and later, his wife. The character is based on  Florence Osbeck.

Nelson Van Alden / George Mueller

Michael Shannon portrays Nelson Van Alden / George Mueller, a former Prohibition agent on the run after the murder of his former partner. Under the alias George Mueller, he inadvertently gets caught up in the conflict between Dean O'Banion and Al Capone. The character is based on William Frank.

Elias "Eli" Thompson
Shea Whigham portrays Elias "Eli" Thompson, Nucky's younger brother and former sheriff of Atlantic County. The character is based on Alfred "Alf" Johnson.

Angela Darmody
Aleksa Palladino portrays Angela Darmody (seasons 1–2), Jimmy's wife and the mother of his young son.

Arnold Rothstein

Michael Stuhlbarg portrays Arnold Rothstein (seasons 1–4), a powerful and intelligent New York gangster who enters into business with Nucky.

Al Capone

Stephen Graham portrays Al Capone, a low-level Chicago gangster with ambitions of leading the Chicago mob.

Charles "Lucky" Luciano

Vincent Piazza portrays Charles "Lucky" Luciano, a Sicilian-American gangster and close associate of Rothstein.

Lucy Danziger
Paz de la Huerta portrays Lucy Danziger (seasons 1–2), Nucky's mistress and a former Ziegfeld Follies dancer.

Albert "Chalky" White
Michael Kenneth Williams portrays Albert "Chalky" White, Nucky's counterpart in Atlantic City's black community.

Edward "Eddie" Kessler
Anthony Laciura portrays Edward "Eddie" Kessler, Nucky's German personal assistant and valet. The character is based on Louis Kessel.

Mickey Doyle

Paul Sparks portrays Mickey Doyle, an Atlantic City bootlegger. The character is based on Mickey Duffy.

Louis Kaestner
Dabney Coleman (seasons 1–2) and John Ellison Conlee (season 5) portray Commodore Louis Kaestner, Nucky's mentor and predecessor in Atlantic City, Jimmy's biological father. The character is based on Louis Kuehnle.

Richard Harrow

Jack Huston portrays Richard Harrow (seasons 1–4), a former Army marksman who allies with Jimmy and later Nucky. Disfigured during the war, he wears a mask over half of his face.

Gillian Darmody
Gretchen Mol portrays Gillian Darmody, Jimmy's mother and an old friend of Nucky's. She is also Luciano's former lover.

Owen Sleater
Charlie Cox portrays Owen Sleater (seasons 2–3), an Irish immigrant and IRA member. He has an affair with Margaret, while working his way up in Nucky's organization.

Gyp Rosetti

Bobby Canavale portrays Gyp Rosetti (season 3), a Sicilian gangster backed by Joe Masseria, who challenged Nucky.

Roy Phillips
Ron Livingston portrays Roy Phillips (season 4), a wealthy out-of-town businessman who finds himself getting involved with Gillian Darmody.

Dr. Valentin Narcisse

Jeffrey Wright portrays Dr. Valentin Narcisse (seasons 4–5), a Harlem racketeer who challenges Chalky. The character is based on Casper Holstein.

William "Willie" Thompson
Kevin Csolak (season 3) and Ben Rosenfield (seasons 4–5) portray William "Willie" Thompson, Eli's oldest son and Nucky's nephew who becomes an assistant U.S. Attorney in New York City.

Recurring characters

Introduced in season one
 Anatol Yusef portrays Meyer Lansky, a young protégé of Rothstein and partners with Luciano. The character is based on Meyer Lansky.
 Greg Antonacci portrays Johnny Torrio, Capone's boss in Chicago.
 Enid Graham portrays Rose Van Alden (seasons 1–2), Nelson's ex-wife.
 Tom Aldredge (seasons 1–2) and Ian Hart (season 5) portray Ethan Thompson, Nucky and Eli's father. The character is based on Smith E. Johnson.
 Dana Ivey portrays Mrs. McGarry (season 1), a prominent leader of the Women's Suffrage and Temperance Movements. The character is based on Susan B. Anthony.
 Anna Katarina portrays Isabelle Jeunet (seasons 1, 3), a French woman who owns an haute couture shop on the boardwalk.
 Johnnie Mae portrays Louanne Pratt (season 1), Commodore Kaestner's maid.
 Erik Weiner portrays Agent Sebso (season 1), Van Alden's partner.
 Lisa Joyce portrays Mary Dittrich (season 1), a photographer's assistant and Angela Darmondy's lover.
 Emily Meade portrays Pearl (season 1), a prostitute and Jimmy Darmody's lover.
 Kevin O'Rourke portrays Edward L. Bader, the Atlantic City mayor.
 Robert Clohessy portrays James Neary (seasons 1–4), one of Nucky's political cronies and ward bosses.
 Christopher McDonald portrays Harry M. Daugherty (seasons 1–2), a U.S. Attorney General.

Introduced in season two
 Dominic Chianese (seasons 2–4) and Jordan Lage (season 5) portray Leander Cephas Whitlock, an Atlantic City lawyer and ally to the Commodore.
 Julianne Nicholson portrays Esther Randolph (seasons 2–4), an Assistant Attorney General who investigates Nucky for election fraud. The character is based on Mabel Walker Willebrandt.
 William Forsythe portrays Manny Horvitz (seasons 2–3), a Philadelphia gangster.
 Erik LaRay Harvey portrays Dunn Purnsley (seasons 2–4), a career criminal and later Chalky's second-in-command.
 Glenn Fleshler portrays George Remus (seasons 2–4), a major bootlegger based in Ohio who refers to himself in the third-person.
 Heather Lind portrays Katy (seasons 2–3), Margaret's housemaid and Owen's lover.
 Ivo Nandi portrays Joe Masseria (seasons 2–5), an Italian bootlegger.

Introduced in season three
 Meg Steedle portrays Billie Kent (season 3), a young Broadway actress who begins an affair with Nucky. Killed in an explosion meant for Nucky. The character is based on Billie Dove.
 Stephen Root portrays Gaston Means (seasons 3–4), a con artist, FBI agent, and "fixer" for bootleggers.
 James Cromwell portrays Andrew Mellon (seasons 3–4), the Secretary of the Treasury.
 Wrenn Schmidt portrays Julia Sagorsky (seasons 3–4), Richard's wife.

Introduced in season four
 Patricia Arquette portrays Sally Wheet (seasons 4–5), a Speak-easy owner in Tampa, Florida
 Domenick Lombardozzi portrays Ralph Capone (seasons 4–5), Al Capone's brother.
 Morgan Spector portrays Frank Capone (season 4), Al Capone's level-headed brother.
 Brian Geraghty portrays James "Jim" Tolliver (season 4), an FBI agent under the direction of J. Edgar Hoover posing as a corrupt prohibition agent under the name Warren Knox in Atlantic City.
 Margot Bingham portrays Daughter Maitland (seasons 4–5), a singer and ward of Dr. Valentin Narcisse who begins an affair with Chalky White.

Introduced in season five
 Paul Calderon portrays Arquimedes (season 5), Nucky Thompson's personal bodyguard.
 Travis Tope portrays Tommy Darmody/Slim (season 5), the son of James and Angela Darmody.

Characters as performers

Characters as athletes

Notes

References

Characters
Boardwalk Empire
Boardwalk Empire